In number theory and set theory, the minimum overlap problem is a problem proposed by Hungarian mathematician Paul Erdős in 1955.

Formal statement of the problem 

Let  and  be two complementary subsets, a splitting of the set of natural numbers , such that both have the same cardinality, namely .

The problem is to estimate  when  is sufficiently large.

History 

This problem can be found amongst the problems proposed by Paul Erdős in combinatorial number theory, known by English speakers as the Minimum overlap problem. It was first formulated in the 1955 article Some remarks on number theory (in Hebrew) in Riveon Lematematica, and has become one of the classical problems described by Richard K. Guy in his book Unsolved problems in number theory.

Partial results 

Lower

Upper 

J. K. Haugland showed that the limit of  exists and that it is less than 0.385694. For his research, he was awarded a prize in a young scientists competition in 1993. In 1996, he improved the upper bound to 0.38201 using a result of Peter Swinnerton-Dyer. This has now been further improved to 0.38093. In 2022, the lower bound was shown to be at least 0.379005 by E. P. White.

The first known values of  

It is just the Law of Small Numbers that it is

References 

Additive number theory
Unsolved problems in number theory